Anathallis polygonoides is a species of orchid plant native to Trinidad and Tobago.

References 

polygonoides
Flora of Trinidad and Tobago
Flora without expected TNC conservation status